The Bridge: A Tribute To Neil Young is a 1989 tribute album that features alternative rock bands covering songs written by Neil Young. A portion of the profits from the album were donated to The Bridge School, which develops and uses advanced technologies to aid in the instruction of disabled children. It was released on Caroline Records and conceived by executive producer Terry Tolkin.

Track listing

References

Neil Young tribute albums
1989 compilation albums
Alternative rock compilation albums
Caroline Records compilation albums